The 1978 Cincinnati Reds season was a season in American baseball. The Reds finished in second place in the National League West with a record of 92-69, 2½ games behind the Los Angeles Dodgers. The Reds were managed by Sparky Anderson and played their home games at Riverfront Stadium. Following the season, Anderson was replaced as manager by John McNamara, and Pete Rose left to sign with the Philadelphia Phillies for the 1979 season.

Offseason 
 October 31, 1977: Woodie Fryman and Bill Caudill were traded by the Reds to the Chicago Cubs for Bill Bonham.
 October 31, 1977: Joe Henderson was purchased from the Reds by the Toronto Blue Jays.
 December 9, 1977: Dave Collins was acquired by the Reds from the Seattle Mariners for Shane Rawley.
 February 25, 1978: Dave Revering and cash were traded by the Reds to the Oakland Athletics for Doug Bair.

Spring training
In honor of Saint Patrick's Day, Reds general manager Dick Wagner had green versions of the Reds' uniforms made. The Reds hosted the New York Yankees at Al Lopez Field on March 17, 1978. This was the first time a major league team wore green trimmed uniforms on March 17, a practice adopted in subsequent years by multiple major league teams.

Regular season 

During the season, Pete Rose tied the National League record with a 44-game hitting streak held by Willie Keeler. The streak began on June 14, and came to an end on August 1.

On June 16, 1978 at Riverfront Stadium, Tom Seaver recorded a 4-0 no-hitter against the St. Louis Cardinals. It was the only no-hitter of his professional career.

Season standings

Record vs. opponents

Notable transactions 
 June 6, 1978: 1978 Major League Baseball draft
Skeeter Barnes was drafted by the Reds in the 16th round. Player signed June 8, 1978.
Otis Nixon was drafted by the Reds in the 21st round, but did not sign.

 May 19, 1978: Dale Murray was traded by the Reds to the New York Mets for Ken Henderson.

Pete Rose hitting streak 
On May 5, 1978, Rose became the 13th and youngest player in major league history to collect his 3,000th career hit, with a single off Expos pitcher Steve Rogers. On June 14 in Cincinnati, Rose singled in the first inning off Cubs pitcher Dave Roberts; Rose would proceed to get a hit in every game he played until August 1, making a run at Joe DiMaggio's record 56-game hitting streak, which had stood virtually unchallenged for 37 years. The streak started quietly, but by the time it had reached 30 games, the media took notice and a pool of reporters accompanied Rose and the Reds to every game. On July 19 against the Phillies, Rose was hitless going into the ninth with his team trailing. He ended up walking and the streak appeared over. But the Reds managed to bat through their entire lineup, giving Rose another chance. Facing Ron Reed, Rose laid down a perfect bunt single to extend the streak to 32 games.

He eventually tied Willie Keeler's single season National League record at 44 games; but on August 1, the streak came to an end as Gene Garber of the Braves struck out Rose in the ninth inning. The competitive Rose was sour after the game, blasting Garber and the Braves for treating the situation "like it was the ninth inning of the 7th game of the World Series" and adding that "Phil Niekro would have given me a fastball to hit."

Roster

Player stats

Batting

Starters by position 
Note: Pos = Position; G = Games played; AB = At bats; H = Hits; Avg. = Batting average; HR = Home runs; RBI = Runs batted in

Other batters 
Note: G = Games played; AB = At bats; H = Hits; Avg. = Batting average; HR = Home runs; RBI = Runs batted in

Pitching

Starting pitchers 
Note: G = Games pitched; IP = Innings pitched; W = Wins; L = Losses; ERA = Earned run average; SO = Strikeouts

Other pitchers 
Note: G = Games pitched; IP = Innings pitched; W = Wins; L = Losses; ERA = Earned run average; SO = Strikeouts

Relief pitchers 
Note: G = Games pitched; W = Wins; L = Losses; SV = Saves; ERA = Earned run average; SO = Strikeouts

Farm system 

LEAGUE CHAMPIONS: Billings

Notes

References 
1978 Cincinnati Reds season at Baseball Reference

Cincinnati Reds seasons
Cincinnati Reds season
Cincinnati Reds